Fred Fabian Ngajiro, also known as Fred Vunjabei, is a Tanzanian entrepreneur and businessman. He is the founder and CEO of Vunjabei Group Limited and president of Too Much Money Limited. He is among the youngest entrepreneurs in Tanzania and billionaires. As of November 2020, Fred has an estimate net worth of Tanzanian Shilling 4.64 Billion according to The Citizen Magazine

Early life and education 
Born 16 June 1987 in Iringa, Tanzania and spent his early life in Iringa and later on took his bachelor's degree of commerce and finance from 2007 to 2010 at University of Dar es Salaam then pursued a Masters of Business Administration at Mzumbe University in 2014.

Career 
He started his first business of collecting used mobile phones from South Africa and sell them at a cheaper price in Tanzania and Zanzibar. Within a year he was able to generate enough capital to start another business venture which was a car dealership business , but this was not a breakthrough for him.

After his journey from China in 2015, he went back to Tanzania and establish a clothing line business named Vunjabei (T) Group Limited also known as Vunjabei Fashion Store. In 2017, Fred Ngajiro and his co-partner Frank Knows founded Too Much Money Limited , an entertainment company that works with Tanzania musicians and celebrities. He is currently Founder and chief executive officer of Vunja Bei (T) Group Limited but also a President of Too Much Money Limited.

Nominations and awards 
 2019: Nominated as "Best Male Entrepreneur On The Digital'' at Tanzania Digital Awards (TDA).
 2020: Won "Most Preferred Upcoming Male Business Icon of the Year 2020“ at Tanzania Consumer Choice Awards ( TCCA).

References

External links 

 
 Vunjabei Stores Official Website

Living people
1987 births
People from Dar es Salaam
Tanzanian Christians
Tanzanian businesspeople
Tanzanian billionaires
Tanzanian chief executives